Daniel Allen Campbell (born April 13, 1976), nicknamed "Motor City Dan Campbell", or "MCDC" for short, is an American football coach and a former tight end who is the head coach for the Detroit Lions of the National Football League (NFL). He previously served as the assistant head coach and tight ends coach for the New Orleans Saints from 2016 to 2020 and also served as an assistant coach for the Miami Dolphins from 2010 to 2015, most recently as the interim head coach and tight ends coach.

Campbell played college football for Texas A&M. He was drafted by the New York Giants in the third round of the 1999 NFL Draft, and subsequently played in the NFL for the Dallas Cowboys, the Detroit Lions and the New Orleans Saints. As a player, Campbell played in the Super Bowl with the Giants in 2000.

Early years
Campbell was born in Clifton, Texas and attended Glen Rose High School, where he was a tailback and tight end.

Playing career

College
Campbell accepted a football scholarship from Texas A&M University. In his last 2 seasons, he shared the tight end position with Derrick Spiller. As a junior, he posted 12 receptions for 143 yards (11.9-yard average) and 2 touchdowns.

As a senior, he started 2 games at the "B" slot, flanker, one game at split end and 2 contests at flanker. He recorded 7 receptions for 68 yards, one touchdown and 3 special teams tackles.

National Football League

New York Giants
Campbell was selected by the New York Giants in the third round (79th overall) of the 1999 NFL Draft. In 2000, he started 4 games and was a part of the team that appeared in Super Bowl XXXV. In 2001, he became the team's regular starting tight end after passing Howard Cross on the depth chart and was mainly used as a blocking tight end.

In 2002, his blocking helped Kerry Collins throw for a club record 4,073 yards and Tiki Barber rush for the second best total in franchise history 1,387 yards.

Dallas Cowboys
Campbell was one of the first free agents to sign with the Dallas Cowboys after Bill Parcells was named the head coach in 2003. He quickly became a team leader and although Jason Witten emerged as the main tight end, Campbell still served as a mentor and remained a key blocker on the offensive line.

In 2004, he only played in three games because of torn ligaments in his foot and was placed on the injured reserve list on September 30.

In 2005, he recovered from an appendectomy on July 27, missing only 10 days of practice and returned to start all four preseason games. The team employed two-tight end sets, which allowed him to start 12 games alongside Witten.

Detroit Lions
On March 14, 2006, Campbell was signed as a free agent by the Detroit Lions. Known mostly as a blocking tight end, he posted career-highs in receiving yards (308), average per reception (14.7 avg), long reception (30 yards), and touchdowns (four), the most by a Lions tight end since 2001.

On September 22, 2007, he was placed on injured reserve with an elbow injury. On September 9, 2008, he was again placed on injured reserve with a hamstring injury. He was released on February 9, 2009.

New Orleans Saints
On February 26, 2009, Campbell signed as a free agent with the New Orleans Saints, reuniting with head coach Sean Payton, who was his offensive coordinator with the Cowboys and the Giants. On August 10, he was placed on injured reserve with an MCL injury he suffered in training camp. He spent the entire season on injured reserve and was not granted a Super Bowl ring by the team when they won Super Bowl XLIV.

NFL career statistics

Coaching career

Miami Dolphins
In 2010, Campbell began his coaching career when he was hired by the Miami Dolphins as a coaching intern. In 2011, Campbell was promoted to the tight ends coach. Following the firing of the Dolphins head coach Joe Philbin on October 5, 2015 after a 1-3 start, Campbell was named the interim head coach for the remainder of the 2015 season. Campbell led the team to five wins and seven losses.

New Orleans Saints
In January 2016, Campbell was hired by the New Orleans Saints as their assistant head coach and tight ends coach under head coach Sean Payton.

Detroit Lions
Campbell was appointed head coach of the Detroit Lions on January 20, 2021. In his introductory press conference the following day, he famously said, "This team is going to take on the identity of this city, and this city's been down and it's found a way to get up. This team's going to be built on, we're going to kick you in the teeth....We're gonna get knocked down and on the way up, we're going to bite a kneecap off....Before long we're going to be the last one standing. Any loss that we take, we're going to feel the full pain from it and not be numb to it."

2021 Season
After starting the season 0–10–1, which included a 16–16 tie against the Pittsburgh Steelers in Week 9, Campbell and the Lions recorded their first victory of the season against the Minnesota Vikings during week 13. Quarterback Jared Goff threw the game-winning touchdown with two seconds remaining in regulation and the Lions won 29–27. After winning three of their final six games of the season, Campbell finished his first season with a 3–13–1 record.

2022 Season
Despite a 1-6 start for the Lions, Campbell and the Lions would have a mid-season turnaround, winning eight of their next ten games finishing the season with a 9-8 record, and remaining in playoff contention until the final day of the regular season where they would be eliminated by the Seattle Seahawks. However the Lions clinched their first winning season since 2017 after a win over the Green Bay Packers in Week 18.

Head coaching record

*Interim head coach

Personal life
Campbell has two children with his wife Holly.

Campbell is a noted fan of Metallica, and during his time at Texas A&M, he was nicknamed "Dantallica" by his roommate Shane Lechler. He also enjoys country music and classic rock. During his playing career, he was nicknamed "The Dude", due to his resemblance to Jeff Bridges' character in The Big Lebowski. Upon joining the Detroit Lions, he gained the nickname "MC/DC" by Pat McAfee on his daily podcast. The acronym is short for Motor City Dan Campbell, and also a spoof of and reference to AC/DC.

References

External links
 Detroit Lions profile
 Pro Football Reference profile

1976 births
Living people
People from Clifton, Texas
Players of American football from Texas
American football tight ends
Texas A&M Aggies football players
Dallas Cowboys players
Detroit Lions players
New Orleans Saints players
New York Giants players
Coaches of American football from Texas
Miami Dolphins coaches
Miami Dolphins head coaches
New Orleans Saints coaches
Detroit Lions coaches
Detroit Lions head coaches
People from Glen Rose, Texas
Ed Block Courage Award recipients